John Hostetter (October 6, 1946 – September 2, 2016) was an American actor and visual artist. He played John, the stage manager on the fictional FYI newsmagazine, on the CBS sitcom Murphy Brown starring Candice Bergen; he appeared in 65 of the series's 247 episodes from 1988-98.

Early life
Hostetter was born in Brooklyn, New York, on October 6, 1946. He was raised in Hanover, Pennsylvania, and graduated from Eichelberger High School. He attended both Catawba College and the University of North Carolina at Charlotte before completing his master's degree in acting at Cornell University. Following college, Hostetter joined the  National Shakespeare Company before relocating to California in 1971 to pursue acting. In 1971, he co-starred with Christopher Reeve in a stage production of Samuel Beckett's play, Waiting for Godot.

Career
He appeared in more than 100 film and television roles throughout his professional career. His televisions credits from the 1970s to 2000s include: Cagney & Lacey, Coach, The Golden Girls, Knight Rider, Matlock, Simon & Simon, NYPD Blue, JAG, Sheena, and T. J. Hooker. His films included Into the Night (1985), Heartbreak Ridge (1986), Beverly Hills Cop II (1987), No Way Out (1987), Leonard Part 6 (1987), and Star Trek: Insurrection (1998).

In 1985, Hostetter was cast as the voice of Bazooka on the popular animated series, G.I. Joe: A Real American Hero, which launched his voice acting career. He reprised his role of Bazooka in the spin-off film, G.I. Joe: The Movie, which was released on VHS in 1987. A decade later, Hostetter provided English-language voices for Hayao Miyazaki's anime feature, Princess Mononoke, released in 1997. His voice credits also included video games, including Vampire Hunter D in 1999.

Personal life
In 2001, Hostetter and his wife, Del, moved to Florida where he worked as a visual artist.

Death
He died after a long battle with cancer in Port Orange, Florida, on September 2, 2016, aged 69, a month shy of his 70th birthday. He was cremated and his ashes were sprinkled into the Atlantic Ocean.

Filmography

Film

Television

Discography
John Hostetter can be heard on lead vocals and harmonica on a song by Bruno Blum titled "Bruno Blum Bruno Blum Bruno Blum", which was recorded in Los Angeles in August 1996.

References

External links

 
 "Bruno Blum Bruno Blum Bruno Blum"

1946 births
2016 deaths
American male television actors
American male film actors
American male stage actors
American male voice actors
Cornell University alumni
Catawba College alumni
Deaths from cancer in Florida
University of North Carolina at Charlotte alumni
People from Hanover, Pennsylvania
People from Brooklyn
Male actors from New York City
Male actors from Pennsylvania